Hillar Liitoja is a Canadian playwright and theatre director. He is most noted for his 1993 play The Last Supper, which won the Floyd S. Chalmers Canadian Play Award in 1994 and was adapted by Cynthia Roberts into the 1994 feature film The Last Supper.

Trained as a concert pianist, Liitoja founded his own Toronto theatre company, DNA Theatre, in the 1980s. His other plays have included This Is What Happens in Orangeville, The Panel, The Deputation, Sick, Poundemonium, Artaud and His Doubles, Phalanx, Paula and Karl, Wit in Love and I Know and Feel That Fate Is Harsh But I Am So Loathe to Accept This.

He has won several Dora Mavor Moore Awards for Best Direction of a Play in the Small Theatre division, winning in 1989 for a production of Hamlet, in 1991 for Sick, and in 1994 for The Last Supper.

References

20th-century Canadian dramatists and playwrights
20th-century Canadian male writers
21st-century Canadian dramatists and playwrights
21st-century Canadian male writers
Canadian male dramatists and playwrights
Canadian theatre directors
Writers from Toronto
Living people
Dora Mavor Moore Award winners
Year of birth missing (living people)